The Hyacinth Stakes is an international listed flat horse race in Japan open to three-year-old horses. It is run at Tokyo Racecourse over a distance of 1600 metres.

The race was first run in 2003 and is the most important early race in Japan for three year olds on dirt. In 2017, the race began to be included as part of the Road to the Kentucky Derby series.

Winners

See also 
Horse racing in Japan

References 

Horse races in Japan
Flat horse races for three-year-olds
Recurring sporting events established in 2003